Eucalyptus nortonii, commonly known as bundy, mealy bundy or long-leaved box, is a species of small tree that is endemic to south-eastern Australia. It has rough, thick, fibrous or flaky bark on the trunk and larger branches, smooth greyish bark on the thinnest branches, lance-shaped to curved adult leaves, flower buds in groups of seven, white flowers and cup-shaped or cylindrical fruit.

Description
It has rough, coarse, thick, fibrous or flaky bark on the trunk and larger branches, sometimes smooth greyish bark on the thinnest branches. Flowering mainly occurs from January to April and the flowers are white.

Taxonomy and naming
Bundy was first formally described in 1934 by William Blakely who gave it the name Eucalyptus × cordieri var. nortonii and published the description in his book, A Key to the Eucalypts. The type specimens were collected by the beekeeper Alfred Ernest Norton near Nundle. In 1962, Lawrie Johnson changed the name to E. nortonii.

Distribution and habitat
Eucalyptus nortonii is widespread and locally common in open woodland on dry, rocky sites on the tablelands of New South Wales and the Australian Capital Territory south from Manilla. It also occurs in central and eastern Victoria, including near Suggan Buggan and Whitfield and from Castlemaine to the Pyrenees.

References

nortonii
Myrtales of Australia
Flora of New South Wales
Flora of Victoria (Australia)
Trees of Australia
Flora of the Australian Capital Territory
Plants described in 1934
Taxa named by William Blakely